Buntun Bridge is a river bridge that stretches from Tuguegarao City to Solana in Cagayan and spans the Cagayan River, the largest river basin in the Philippines. It forms part of the Santiago-Tuguegarao Road (designated as N51 by the Department of Public Works and Highways highway routing system), a major junction of the Pan-Philippine Highway. It was the longest bridge in the Philippines upon its opening in 1969, surpassed in 1973 by the San Juanico Bridge.

A popular belief is that the bridge is long enough for a person to recite the entire Philippine National Anthem while traversing.

History 

In 1959, President Carlos P. Garcia released  to start the construction of the bridge. The meager amount was augmented in several appropriations embodied in different Republic Acts through the initiative of Cagayan's 2nd District Congressman Benjamin Ligot. The ground-breaking ceremony on December 11, 1960, was attended by President Garcia.

Construction 
The construction was based from the original plan of ten  steel through truss spans and one  I-beam approach on each end. With the initial , Angeleo Alonzo, the first District Engineer of Department of Public Works, Transportation and Communications 2nd Cagayan Engineering District, completed Abutment A. Pier I, footing and pedestal of Pier II.

In 1962, however, Diosdado Macapagal took over as President and no one knew whether or not he would continue the project. Congressman Ligot convinced the President to continue the project under one AGUID Construction Company. The frequent floods have widened the river channel and caused the change of plan for the bridge to 14  Japanese steel through truss spans and one  I-beam approach on the Solana side.

President Ferdinand Marcos ordered Public Works, Transportation and Communications Secretary Antonio Raquiza to assign the bureau’s construction team led by Engineer Rogelio Talastas to Buntun Bridge. The team, under Alonzo's general supervision, went to work in full swing in May 1968.

By May 10 the following year, the bridge was practically completed. However, the construction team was transferred to another project, leaving Alonzo to complete the painting of the landmark structure and the construction of the grouted riprap and the road approaches.

First Lady Imelda Marcos opened the bridge to vehicular traffic on June 1, 1969, which took three administrations to build.

Features

Buntun Bridge serves as the gateway to the Cagayan's provincial capital, Tuguegarao City and links to the second and third district municipalities of Cagayan and Apayao. The road infrastructure measures , considered the longest river bridge in the Philippines. It has 14 Japanese steel spans. The bridge offers an unobstructed, picturesque view of the Cagayan River, the widest and longest river in the country.

See also
List of bridges in the Philippines

Notes

References

External links

Bridges in the Philippines
Buildings and structures in Tuguegarao
Buildings and structures in Cagayan